Middleton is a village in the east of the  English county of Suffolk.

The parish church is dedicated to the Holy Trinity. The village has one pub, the Bell Inn owned by Adnams Brewery, and until the last decade the village had a post office. The nearest post office now is located in the village of Westleton. There is also a park and a yearly village fête.

Middleton Primary School currently caters for children aged 5 to 11 years old, and works in partnership with Yoxford & Peasenhall Primary School in Yoxford and Southwold Primary School in Southwold. The three schools make up the Yoxford Valley Partnership of Schools. 

Translator Michael Hamburger lived in the village until his death in 2007.

References

External links

Villages in Suffolk
Civil parishes in Suffolk